Nicholas Burgess Farrell (born 2 October 1958) is an English journalist and the author of Mussolini: A New Life.

Early life
Farrell was born in London, on 2 October 1958. He attended The King's School, Canterbury and studied history at Gonville and Caius College, Cambridge, earning his B.A. on 20 June 1980. He completed his apprenticeship and his National Certificate Examination exam in October 1984.

Career
He worked as journalist for the Sunday Telegraph from 1987 to 1996, later moving to The Spectator from April 1996 to July 1998; Farrell then moved to Forlì, Italy, married an Italian woman and joined the Italian journalist association, at first working for the local newspaper "La voce di Romagna" and later for "Libero".

Farrell's most famous article is a 2003 interview with Silvio Berlusconi for The Spectator, where the Italian prime minister made statements which sparked criticism in Italy.

Today he writes mainly for Libero, a liberal conservative newspaper supportive of centre-right politics.

His 2003 book, Mussolini: A New Life, described Benito Mussolini as an unfairly maligned leader whose “charisma” and Machiavellian adroitness were “phenomenal”; it was welcomed by British novelist and academic Tim Parks as a "welcome" revisionist biography.

References

Works 
 "A Chip off the Old Block?", the Independent, 25 June 2003.
 Mussolini: A New Life (2003)    (cloth)  (paper)

Living people
English male journalists
1958 births
The Spectator people
English emigrants to Italy